George Washington Morgan (September 20, 1820 – July 26, 1893) was an American soldier, lawyer, politician, and diplomat. He fought in the Texas Revolution and the Mexican–American War, and was a general in the Union Army during the American Civil War. Morgan later served as a three-term postbellum United States Congressman from Ohio. He also served as the United States Ambassador to Portugal from 1858 to 1861, during the term of President James Buchanan.

Early life and career
Morgan was born in Washington County, Pennsylvania, to a prominent family. His grandfather, Col. George Morgan, was the first to give President Thomas Jefferson the information regarding Aaron Burr's conspiracy. G. W. Morgan was educated in local schools, and then in 1836, he withdrew from Washington College at the age of 16 and enlisted in a military company that was commanded by his older brother, Thomas Jefferson Morgan. They traveled south to Mexican Texas to fight in the struggle for independence from Mexico. Morgan received a commission in the regular Texas Army under Sam Houston as a lieutenant, and rose to captain commanding the post at Galveston. He served with Captain Robertson's rangers and Company B of the First Regiment of Texas Rangers. He resigned in 1839 to return to Pennsylvania.

In 1841, he entered the United States Military Academy, but left in 1843 due to poor grades. He moved to Mount Vernon, Ohio, studied law, passed the bar exam, and established a law practice there in 1845. He served as prosecutor for Knox County.

When war erupted with Mexico, Morgan was appointed Colonel of the 2nd Ohio Volunteer Infantry. He subsequently was commissioned as Colonel of the 15th U.S. Infantry in March 1847, serving under General Winfield Scott. To put an end to the guerrilla warfare and murder of American soldiers, Colonel Morgan seized a number of prominent Mexican citizens and issued a proclamation announcing that for every American soldier killed by the guerrillas, a citizen would be executed. The murders ceased at once. He was breveted to brigadier general in 1848 for his gallantry at the battles of Contreras and Churubusco, where he was severely wounded. Returning to Ohio to recuperate, he received the formal thanks of the Ohio legislature.

Morgan resumed his law practice in Mount Vernon. He married Sarah H. Hall of Zanesville, Ohio, on October 7, 1851, and they had two children.

He was a lawyer until 1856, when he was appointed by President James Buchanan as the United States Consul to Marseilles. Two years later, he became the Minister to Portugal, which post he held until 1861, when he returned to the United States following the outbreak of the Civil War.

Civil War
Morgan, due to his previous military experience in two wars, was appointed as a brigadier general in the Union Army on November 21, 1861, reporting to Maj. Gen. Don Carlos Buell in the Western Theater. In March 1862, Morgan assumed command of the 7th Division of the Army of the Ohio and was ordered to southeastern Kentucky to drive the Confederates from the strategic Cumberland Gap and occupy it. Moving quickly, Morgan defeated Carter L. Stevenson's Confederates and chased off the defenders on June 18, 1862. He then successfully manned the gap with his four brigades of infantry, augmented by artillery placed on the heights.

However, in September, he was forced to hastily retreat towards the Ohio River as Braxton Bragg invaded Kentucky, cutting off his supply routes. Morgan conducted a masterful retreat in the face of the much superior enemy force, despite being harassed by constant attacks from Col. John H. Morgan's guerrillas. George Morgan's 8,000 men marched over 200 miles from Cumberland Gap in sixteen days to Greenup, Kentucky, arriving there on October 3 on their way to Camp Dennison in Ohio.

In November, Morgan served with Maj. Gen. Jacob D. Cox in western Virginia (now West Virginia) in the Kanawha River Valley, defending Charleston.

The following year, Morgan commanded the 3rd Division of the XIII Corps under Maj. Gen. William T. Sherman during the Vicksburg Campaign. Sherman, however, was upset with Morgan's performance at the battle of Chickasaw Bluffs, when he failed to carry out orders for a planned attack. Morgan soon redeemed himself as he subsequently led the XIII Corps force that captured Fort Hindman in Arkansas. His health having deteriorated from the lengthy campaigning, and dissatisfied with the use of black troops, Morgan resigned his commission on June 8, 1863, and returned to Ohio and civilian life.

Later life and political career

While strongly in favor of maintaining the Union at any cost, Morgan was equally opposed to any governmental interference with the state institution of the South, slavery, and believed that the Federal government had no legal right to abolish the practice. Morgan campaigned in Ohio for former army general George B. McClellan in the 1864 Presidential Election. In 1865 he was the unsuccessful Democratic candidate for Governor of Ohio, being defeated by his former commander in the Kanawha Valley, Jacob D. Cox.

Nonetheless, he continued to pursue a political career, and in 1866 was elected to the Fortieth United States Congress from Ohio's 13th District, serving on the Committee on Foreign Affairs. There, he voted against the impeachment of President Andrew Johnson. Two years later, he appeared to have won reelection. However, his seat was contested by the defeated Republican candidate, Columbus Delano, who supplanted him on June 3, 1868. Not deterred, Morgan campaigned again in 1870 and was elected to another term, holding his Congressional seat until 1873, serving on the committees on foreign affairs, military affairs, and reconstruction. He was an outspoken critic of the administration's harsh policies on Reconstruction and constantly battled with the Radical Republicans. Morgan ran for Speaker of the United States House of Representatives, but was defeated by James G. Blaine.

Retirement and death 
Following his retirement from Congress, Morgan was a delegate-at-large to the 1876 Democratic National Convention in St. Louis.

He died at Fort Monroe, Virginia on July 26, 1893, the last surviving general of the Mexican-American War. He was buried in Mound View Cemetery in Mount Vernon, Ohio.

See also

 List of American Civil War generals (Union)
 List of Ohio's American Civil War generals

Notes

References
 Handbook of Texas Online
 Kentucky Historical Society - roadside markers for Morgan's Retreat
 Newark, Ohio, Daily Advocate, August 18, 1900.
 

Attribution

Further reading
 Asbury, Samuel E., ed., "Extracts from the Reminiscences of General George W. Morgan," Southwestern Historical Quarterly 30 (January 1927).

External links
 
 Retrieved on 2008-08-13
 Smithsonian Institution collection - photo of Morgan's Mexican-American War flintlock pistol
 

1820 births
1893 deaths
People from Washington County, Pennsylvania
Washington & Jefferson College alumni
People of Ohio in the American Civil War
American military personnel of the Mexican–American War
People of the Texas Revolution
Union Army generals
People from Mount Vernon, Ohio
County district attorneys in Ohio
19th-century American diplomats
19th-century American politicians
Ambassadors of the United States to Portugal
Democratic Party members of the United States House of Representatives from Ohio
Military personnel from Pennsylvania